The Heimstock (el. 3,102 metres) is a mountain of the Glarus Alps, located on the border between the Swiss cantons of Uri and Graubünden. It lies between the Maderanertal (Uri) and the Val Russein (Graubünden). On its northern side lies the Hüfi Glacier.

References

External links
 Heimstock on Hikr

Mountains of Switzerland
Mountains of the Alps
Alpine three-thousanders
Mountains of Graubünden
Mountains of the canton of Uri
Graubünden–Uri border